Eduard Samuilovich Pantserzhanskiy (– 26 September 1937) was a Russian military leader, Commander-in-Chief of the Soviet Naval Forces from December 1921 to December 1924.

Biography 
Pantserzhanskiy was born in Liepāja, Latvia the son of a Polish nobleman and studied at the Riga Technical University. He graduated from the Naval Academy in 1910 and joined the Baltic Fleet. Pantserzhanskiy was an officer on the destroyer Grom and fought in the Battle of Moon Sound. During the Civil war he fought on riverine flotillas on Lake Onega and the Volga-Caspian front.

Between 1921 and 1924 Pantserzhanskiy was a commander of the Soviet Navy. From 1924 he joined the general staff holding various commands.

Pantserzhanskiy was denounced in 1937 by Boris Feldman and arrested in June. He was tried, sentenced to death and executed by a firing squad on 26 September 1937 at the Kommunarka shooting ground. Pantserzhanskiy was posthumously rehabilitated in 1956.

Notes 

1887 births
1937 deaths
Military personnel from Liepāja
People from Courland Governorate
People from the Russian Empire of Polish descent
Imperial Russian Navy officers
Russian military personnel of World War I
Soviet military personnel of the Russian Civil War
Soviet admirals
Riga Technical University alumni
Recipients of the Order of the Red Banner
Polish people executed by the Soviet Union
Great Purge victims from Poland
People executed by the Soviet Union by firing squad
Soviet rehabilitations